Uitikon is a village and municipality in the district of Dietikon in the canton of Zürich in Switzerland. Besides the village of Uitikon itself, the municipality includes the villages of Waldegg and Ringlikon.

Geography

Uitikon lies on the northern end of the Albis hills that include the Uetliberg mountain and form the western boundary of the city of Zürich. The village of Uitikon lies to the north of the road, whilst Waldegg and Ringlikon lie to the south.

Of this area, 38.8% is used for agricultural purposes, while 33.8% is forested. Of the rest of the land, 27.2% is settled (buildings or roads) and the remainder (0.2%) is non-productive (rivers, glaciers or mountains).   housing and buildings made up 22.1% of the total area, while transportation infrastructure made up the rest (5%). Of the total unproductive area, water (streams and lakes) made up 0% of the area.   28.3% of the total municipal area was undergoing some type of construction.

Demographics
, 11.9% of the population was made up of foreign nationals.   the gender distribution of the population was 49.4% male and 50.6% female. Over the last 10 years the population has grown at a rate of 18%. Most of the population speaks German  (90.3%), with French being second most common ( 2.1%) and English being third ( 1.5%).

In the 2007 election the most popular party was the SVP which received 35.3% of the vote.  The next three most popular parties were the FDP (28.8%), the SPS (9.7%) and the CVP (8.7%).

The age distribution of the population is children and teenagers (0–19 years old) make up 19.5% of the population, while adults (20–64 years old) make up 61.5% and seniors (over 64 years old) make up 19%.  In Uitikon about 89.6% of the population (between age 25-64) have completed either non-mandatory upper secondary education or additional higher education (either university or a Fachhochschule).  There are 1569 households in Uitikon.

Uitikon has an unemployment rate of 1.51%.  , there were 55 people employed in the primary economic sector and about 13 businesses involved in this sector.  60 people are employed in the secondary sector and there are 13 businesses in this sector.  785 people are employed in the tertiary sector, with 154 businesses in this sector.   65% of the working population were employed full-time, and 35% were employed part-time.

 there were 1055 Catholics and 1607 Protestants in Uitikon. From the 2000 census, 47.2% were some type of Protestant, with 45.2% belonging to the Swiss Reformed Church and 2% belonging to other Protestant churches.  27.8% of the population were Catholic. Of the rest of the population, 0% were Muslim, 4.5% belonged to another religion (not listed), 2.3% did not give a religion, and 17.6% were atheist or agnostic.

Transport
The main road west from Zürich to Birmensdorf passes through the municipality, and provides access to the A3 motorway, which passes to the west.

Uitikon Waldegg railway station, in the village of Waldegg, is a stop of the S-Bahn Zürich on the line S10. PostAuto bus route 201 links the villages of Uitikon, Waldegg and Ringlikon to each other and Waldegg station. Ringlikon village is also served by the nearby Ringlikon railway station, also on the S10.

References

External links 

  

Municipalities of the canton of Zürich